Razz may refer to:

 Razz (poker), a form of stud poker
 Razz (rapper), winner of MGP Nordic 2002
 "Razz" (song), a Kings of Leon song
 Razz, Arab Rock Jazz, a music genre promoted by Aziz Maraka & Razz
 Blowing a raspberry
 Golden Raspberry Awards, typically referred to as "Razzies"
 Madame Razz, a fictional character in the television series She-Ra: Princess of Power

See also
 Raz (disambiguation)
 Razzie
 Razzy